Timothy Edgar Trainor (born January 25, 1961) is the current President of Mount St. Mary's University. Previously, Trainor was a United States Army brigadier general where he served as the 13th Dean of the United States Military Academy.

Early life and education
Born in the state of New York, Trainor graduated from West Point with a B.S. degree in 1983. He later earned an M.B.A. degree from the Fuqua School of Business at Duke University. Trainor completed a Ph.D. degree in industrial engineering at North Carolina State University in 2001. His doctoral thesis was entitled Scheduling military deployments and his advisors were Thom J. Hodgson and Russell E. King.

Military career
Upon graduation from West Point, Trainor was commissioned as an engineering officer. While on active duty Trainor served in a variety positions including in Germany, Honduras, Fort Bragg, North Carolina, Fort Riley, Kansas and Sarajevo, Bosnia.

US Military Academy
Trainor's prior duties at the U.S. Military Academy included the director of the Engineering Management program and head of the Department of Systems Engineering. In the summer of 2010, Secretary of Defense Robert Gates announced that President Barack Obama had nominated Trainor to become the next Dean. As Dean, Trainor oversaw over 800 faculty and staff across 13 departments and 23 research centers.

Mount St. Mary's University
In the summer of 2016 Trainor was selected as Mount St. Mary's University's 26th interim president for a year and then permanently retained the position. During Trainor's leadership thus far, he has increased enrollment, championed three new academic programs, a variety of new academic leadership moves, an agreement with the local Frederick Community College, and secured a $1 million donation to create the Palmieri Center for Entrepreneurship.

Personal life
Trainor is married to his West Point classmate, Colonel (retired) Donna Marie Brazil and they have three children.

References 

1961 births
Living people
United States Military Academy alumni
Military personnel from New York (state)
United States Army Rangers
Fuqua School of Business alumni
North Carolina State University alumni
United States Military Academy faculty
United States Army generals
Brigadier generals
Mount St. Mary's University faculty